The 1997 ATP Super 9 (also known as Mercedes-Benz Super 9 for sponsorship reasons) were part of the 1997 ATP Tour, the elite tour for professional men's tennis organised by the Association of Tennis Professionals.

Results

Titles Champions

Singles

See also 
 ATP Tour Masters 1000
 1997 ATP Tour
 1997 WTA Tier I Series
 1997 WTA Tour

External links 
 Association of Tennis Professionals (ATP) official website

ATP Super 9
ATP Tour Masters 1000